Alichen is a town in Mokokchung district of Nagaland state in India. It is situated south of Mokokchung town. It is the headquarters of the 2nd Battalion of the Nagaland Armed Forces (NAP). 2001 census figures put the town's population at 4403 with 880 households. The number of children below the age of five is 572. Alichen is part of the Alichen-Mokokchung-DEF urban agglomeration.

External links 
- Govt. Of Nagaland Official website

Cities and towns in Mokokchung district